Zohaib Ahmed (born 2 March 1986) is a Pakistani cricketer who played for Islamabad and Pakistan Television. He played in 85 first-class, 64 List A, and 50 Twenty20 matches from 2005 to 2018.

References

External links
 

1986 births
Living people
Pakistani cricketers
Attock Group cricketers
Federal Areas cricketers
Islamabad cricketers
Cricketers from Islamabad
Islamabad Leopards cricketers
Pakistan Television cricketers